Fontanelice is a comune (municipality) in the Province of Bologna in the Italian region Emilia-Romagna, located about  southeast of Bologna.

Fontanelice borders the following municipalities: Borgo Tossignano, Casalfiumanese, Casola Valsenio, Castel del Rio. A reinforced concrete bridge over the Santerno River connects Fontanelice to the village of Casalfiumanese.

Demographic evolution

Notable residents
Architect Giuseppe Mengoni was born in Fontanelice.

References

Cities and towns in Emilia-Romagna